Wilis Stadium is a multi-purpose stadium in Madiun, Indonesia.  It is currently used mostly for football matches. This stadium holds 25,000 spectators.

See also
 List of stadiums in Indonesia

References 

Football venues in Indonesia
Multi-purpose stadiums in Indonesia
Buildings and structures in East Java